Stephen Martin Zinser (born July 1957) is an American-born, London-based hedge fund manager.

Early life
Stephen Martin Zinser was born in July 1957 in the United States. He graduated from Cornell University.

Career
Zinser worked for Chase Manhattan Bank from 1979 to 1992. He worked in the London headquarters of Merrill Lynch from 1993 to 1999.

In February 1999, Zinser co-founded European Credit Management, an asset management firm based in London, with Steven Blakey and Stephen Rumsey. He served as its Chief Executive Officer and Co-Chief Investment Officer. By 2007, the firm had €22 billion of assets under management, when a majority stake was acquired by Wachovia.  The firm was fully owned by Wells Fargo prior to being spun off in 2021 to Allspring Global Investments.

In 2015, Zinser founded Roxbury Asset Management, a London-based firm which manages and invests in liquid alternative strategies. He serves as its Chief Executive Officer.

Philanthropy
Zinser currently acts as a Trustee for the Institute for Strategic Dialogue (“ISD”).  He served on the board of the Gavi Alliance and Chaired the Investment Committee from 2014 to June 2021.  He continues to act as advisor to the Investment Committee and to the Audit & Finance Committee on the COVAX Facility. He also serves on the development board of Gonville and Caius College, Cambridge.

Personal life
Zinser resides in London, U.K. According to the Sunday Times Rich List, he is worth an estimated £172 million in 2016.

References

1957 births
Living people
American emigrants to England
Cornell University alumni
American hedge fund managers
American chief executives of financial services companies